Carl Emil Christian Bonnevie (28 April 1881 – 26 September 1972) was a Norwegian jurist and peace activist. He also served as a Member of the Norwegian Parliament.

Biography
Bonnevie was born in Trondheim as the son of Jacob Aall Bonnevie (1838-1904) and his second wife, Susanne Bryn (1848-1927). He was the younger brother of physician Kristine Bonnevie (1872-1948) and judge Thomas Bonnevie (1879-1960).

He took his artium at Aars and Voss School  in 1900.  He was a reserve officer in the Norwegian Army, attaining the rank of Second Lieutenant in 1901. He was awarded his  Cand. jur. in 1904. In 1905, he became a magistrate in Moss in Østfold. The following the year, he became   deputy proxy at Vinger and Odalen in Hedmark . He was a prosecutor in Kristiania (now Oslo) from 1907 to 1910. He was a lawyer at Kristiania Court of Appeal from 1915. From 1923 to 1929 he was a District Court Judge  in Kristiania. He was assigned to the Agder Court of Appeal in 1936, Eidsivating Court of Appeal from 1949 and Borgarting Court of Appeal in 1950.

From 1917 to 1919, he was editor of the journal Folkefred. He was a board member of the Norwegian Peace Association (Norges Fredsforening)  from 1916 to 1924 and chaired the organization from 1926 to 1929. 
He served as a member of the Parliament of Norway from Bodø and Narvik (Bodø og Narvik) in Nordland with the Labour Party from 1913 to 1915 and for Nordland fylke from 1934 to 1936.

See also
 List of peace activists

References

1881 births
1972 deaths
People from Trondheim
Norwegian Army personnel
Norwegian jurists
Labour Party (Norway) politicians
Members of the Storting
Norwegian anti-war activists
Norwegian people of French descent
Burials at the Cemetery of Our Saviour
Carl